Farid Mammadov (born 30 August 1991, in Baku) is an Azerbaijani singer. He represented Azerbaijan in the Eurovision Song Contest 2013 in Malmö with the song "Hold Me" and came second after Denmark.

Biography

Early life and career
Mammadov was born in Baku, to Asif Mammadov, a professional judoka and amateur rock musician, and Maya Mammadova, a silver-winning Soviet gymnast. Farid Mammadov studied at the Azerbaijan State University of Culture and Arts.

Since childhood, Mammadov sang in the Bulbul ensemble managed by Aybaniz Hashimova. For a long time he was a soloist of this ensemble. He has been interested in soul and jazz since age 8 and cites Stevie Wonder as a major influence.

Mammadov is the author of Gal yanima (Come to Me), one of the songs which he performed during the Azerbaijani Eurovision selection tour.

Besides music, he also practices Greco-Roman wrestling and capoeira.

In 2013, he participated at opening ceremony of the "Gold Grand Prix" international wrestling tournament

In 2015, he participated at the closing of the 1st European Games where he sang the national anthem of Azerbaijan with Sabina Babayeva

Eurovision

In March 2013 Farid won the Azerbaijani national final for the 58th annual Eurovision Song Contest 2013 which was held in Malmö, Sweden in May 2013. Mammadov was the first male solo singer to represent Azerbaijan in the contest. His performance was staged by Fokas Evangelinos, a Greek choreographer who directed the Eurovision performances of Sakis Rouvas and Ani Lorak. Azerbaijan placed 2nd in the 2013 competition, receiving ten 12-point scores and 234 points.

For the first time in the history of Azerbaijan's participation in the Eurovision Song Contest, he was awarded the Marcel Bezençon Artistic Award.

Post-Eurovision
In April 2016, Farid Mammadov married a woman named Nigar in a private ceremony. The couple soon moved to Los Angeles, California, where they welcomed their newborn son in January 2019.

Discography

Singles

References
Official data about him, and about his family 

Specific

External links
www.esctoday.com – Azerbaijan: Farid Mammadov will fly the Azerbaijani flag in Malmo
www.eurovision.tv – Official website of Eurovision – "It's Farid Mammadov for Azerbaijan"
www.itv.az – Farid Mammadov will sing their song in the 58th Eurovision Song Contest in Malmo (Sweden), speaking for his country Azerbaijan

1991 births
Living people
Eurovision Song Contest entrants for Azerbaijan
Eurovision Song Contest entrants of 2013
21st-century Azerbaijani male singers
Azerbaijani pop singers
Azerbaijani jazz singers
English-language singers from Azerbaijan
Folk-pop singers